

Notable alumni

Honorary degree recipients

Board of Trustees

Presidents

References

Kettering University
Kettering University